Wadi Zighen (also Wadi Zighan) is a depression (height 310 metres) located in the Libyan Desert in the Kufra District of Libya, about 180 km north-northwest of El Tag and east of Tazirbu. There are five wells, the most important is named Bir el Hárasc. Around the wells grow some palms, but there are no permanent inhabitants.

Sources

Notes

Oases of Libya
Cyrenaica